The A60 is a road linking Loughborough in Leicestershire, England, with Doncaster in South Yorkshire, via Nottingham.

It takes the following route:
Loughborough
Cotes
Hoton
Rempstone
Costock
Bunny
Bradmore
Ruddington
West Bridgford
Nottingham
Sherwood
Arnold
Ravenshead
Mansfield
Market Warsop
Worksop
Carlton in Lindrick
Tickhill
Wadworth
Doncaster

References

External links

Roads in England
Roads in Yorkshire
Transport in Leicestershire
Transport in Nottinghamshire
Transport in South Yorkshire